The 2017/18 FIS Nordic Combined Continental Cup was the Continental Cup season, organized by the International Ski Federation for men and for ladies. It started on 15 December 2017 in Steamboat Springs, United States of America and concluded on 11 March 2018 in Nizhny Tagil, Russia.

Calendar

Men

Ladies

Standings

Men's overall

Ladies overall

Men's Nations Cup

Ladies Nations Cup

References 

2017 in Nordic combined
2018 in Nordic combined
Nordic combined competitions